Maurice Moore could refer to: 

Maurice George Moore (1854–1939), Irish author, soldier and politician
Maurice Moore (Irish republican) (1894–1921)
Molly Moore (baseball), American baseball player